Maurice Gudin de Vallerin (15 March 1897 – 18 July 1981) was a French equestrian. He competed in two events at the 1936 Summer Olympics.

References

1897 births
1981 deaths
French male equestrians
Olympic equestrians of France
Equestrians at the 1936 Summer Olympics
Sportspeople from Oise